Ukraine is a sovereign state in Eastern Europe, Including Crimea, Ukraine has an area of , making it the largest country entirely within Europe and the 46th largest country in the world, and a population of about 44.5 million, making it the 32nd most populous country in the world.

Ukraine has long been a global breadbasket because of its extensive, fertile farmlands, and it remains one of the world's largest grain exporters. The diversified economy of Ukraine includes a large heavy industry sector, particularly in aerospace and industrial equipment.

For further information on the types of business entities in this country and their abbreviations, see "Business entities in Ukraine".

Notable firms 
This list includes notable companies with primary headquarters located in the country. The industry and sector follow the Industry Classification Benchmark taxonomy. Organizations which have ceased operations are included and noted as defunct.

See also
Economy of Ukraine
PFTS index

Notes

References

External links
 The 2014 Forbes Ukraine 200 companies ranking. Forbes Ukraine.
 The 2016 Forbes Ukraine 200 companies ranking. Forbes Ukraine.

Ukraine